Dikwa is a genus of amphipods in the family Dikwidae, containing the following species:

Dikwa acrania Griffiths, 1974
Dikwa andresi Lörz & Coleman, 2003

References

Gammaridea